Christina Joan Clark (born October 29, 1965) is a former Canadian politician who was the 35th premier of British Columbia (BC), from 2011 to 2017. Clark was the second woman to be premier of BC, after Rita Johnston in 1991, and the first female premier in Canada to lead her party to a plurality of seats in two consecutive general elections.

A member of the British Columbia Liberal Party, Clark was a member of the Legislative Assembly (MLA) from 1996 to 2005 and was deputy premier from 2001 to 2005 during the first term of Gordon Campbell's government. She left politics in 2005, and became the host of an afternoon radio talk show. After Campbell's resignation, Clark won the 2011 leadership election, becoming premier. She re-entered the legislature after winning a by-election on May 11 in Vancouver-Point Grey, the seat left vacant by Campbell. The Liberals were re-elected in the 2013 provincial election in an upset victory. In the 2017 provincial election, the Liberals were reduced to 43 seats—one short of a majority. Following a confidence and supply agreement between the NDP and Green Party, Clark's minority government was defeated 44–42, and NDP leader John Horgan succeeded her as the premier on July 18. Clark subsequently announced that she was resigning as Liberal leader effective August 4 and leaving politics.

Early life and family
Clark was born on October 29, 1965, in Burnaby, British Columbia, the daughter of Mavis Audrey (née Bain) and Jim Clark. Her father was a teacher and a three-time candidate for the legislative assembly, and her mother, who was born in Glasgow, Scotland, was a marriage and family therapist in Vancouver. On June 8, 2016, Clark recounted that, as a 13-year-old girl on her way to work at her first job, she was forcibly grabbed and pulled into some bushes; she also shared that she had been subject to other sexual offences throughout her life and that she had not felt able to share this until a campus sexual assault bill proposed by the Green Party came up.

Clark graduated from Burnaby South Senior Secondary before attending Simon Fraser University (SFU), the Sorbonne in France and the University of Edinburgh in Scotland to major in political science and religious studies. She did not graduate from any post-secondary institution.

In 2001, Clark gave birth to her only child, Hamish Marissen-Clark, with then husband Mark Marissen. Clark was the second woman in Canadian history to give birth to a child while serving as a cabinet minister, after Pauline Marois, then a Quebec provincial minister, in 1985.

Early political career

Opposition
Clark was first elected to the legislative assembly in the 1996 election, representing the riding of Port Moody-Burnaby Mountain. During the next five years, she served as the Official Opposition critic for the environment, children and families and for the public service. She also served as the campaign co-chair for the BC Liberals during the 2001 election, in which the party won 77 of 79 seats in the legislative assembly.

Government
Following the BC Liberal Party's election victory in 2001, Premier Gordon Campbell appointed Clark Minister of Education and Deputy Premier. She brought in a number of changes that were claimed to increase accountability, strengthen parental power in the decision-making process, and provide parents greater choice and flexibility in the school system. These changes were unpopular amongst teachers, school board members, opposition politicians, and union officials who argued that the decision not to fund the pay increases agreed to by the government resulted in funding gaps. The changes made were challenged by the BC Teacher's Federation, and were later found to be unconstitutional.

As Education Minister, Clark sought to increase the independence of the BC College of Teachers against heavy opposition from the British Columbia Teachers' Federation. In 2002 the BC Liberals and Education Minister Christy Clark introduced Bills 27 & 28 forcing teachers back to work and banning collective bargaining. In 2011 the BC Supreme Court found Minister Clark's decision to do so unconstitutional.
Clark was deputy premier at the time of the privatization of BC Rail and resulting scandal. Clark was also the co-chair of the 2001 Liberal campaign, which included a platform that specifically promised not to sell BC Rail. In 2009, Michael Bolton, defence attorney in the Basi-Virk trial, alleged that Clark had participated in the scandal by providing government information to lobbyist Erik Bornmann. These allegations were never proven or tested in court. Her brother Bruce Clark was the subject of one of the warrants. Though confidential draft "Request for Proposal" documents relating to the bid process allegedly provided by Dave Basi were found in Bruce Clark's home no charges were laid against him. Dave Basi and Bob Virk, Liberal Party insiders were charged for accepting benefits from one of the bidders. Clark has rebuffed talk of her links to the scandal as "smear tactics". At the time of the raids and associated warrants, her then-husband Mark Marissen was visited at home by the RCMP. Her husband was also not under investigation, and was told that he might have been the "innocent recipient" of documents then in his possession.

In 2004, Clark was appointed Minister of Children and Family Development after Minister Gordon Hogg was forced to resign.  On September 17, 2004, Clark quit provincial politics and did not seek re-election in the 2005 provincial election. She declared she wanted to spend more time with her three-year-old son.

Campaign for mayor of Vancouver
On August 31, 2005, Clark announced that she would seek the nomination of the Non-Partisan Association (NPA) to run for mayor in the Vancouver Civic Elections against local councillor Sam Sullivan. On September 24, 2005, she lost the NPA's mayoral nomination to Sullivan by 69 votes out of 2,100 cast. Sullivan was subsequently elected Mayor of Vancouver and in 2013 was elected a Liberal MLA while Clark was premier.

Radio show and columnist

Clark hosted The Christy Clark Show, airing weekdays on CKNW 980 AM in Vancouver from August 27, 2007, until the time of her decision to enter the BC Liberal leadership election in December 2010. Clark also served as a weekly columnist for the Vancouver Province and the Vancouver Sun newspapers during the 2005 provincial election and an election analyst for Global BC and CTV News Channel during the 2006 federal election.

Leadership campaign

On December 8, 2010, Clark officially announced her intent to seek the leadership of the BC Liberal Party. While Clark had long been touted as a potential successor to BC Premier Gordon Campbell, she often claimed she had no further interest in a political career. Public polling conducted prior to and after the announcement of her candidacy showed that Clark was the frontrunner to succeed Campbell as leader of the BC Liberals and premier. Clark launched her leadership bid saying she wanted a "family-first agenda". During the campaign she tried to cast herself as an outsider from the current caucus, and as the only candidate who could provide the change voters were looking for. Clark's policy proposals included observing a provincial Family Day in February, establishing an Office of the Municipal Auditor General to monitor local government taxation, and to provide a more open government by holding 12 town hall meetings a year to hear from residents. Regarding the controversial Harmonized Sales Tax (HST), she campaigned early on to cancel the referendum scheduled for September 2011. She suggested a free vote in the legislature by MLAs, believing the HST referendum has little chance of success. "Let our MLAs do their jobs and let our MLAs vote down the HST. Do it by March 31 and get it over with and get on with life in B.C.", Clark told a crowd of about 40 in Pitt Meadows. However, she eventually decided to continue with the planned referendum.

Despite her perceived frontrunner status, backbench MLA Harry Bloy was the only sitting member of BC Liberal caucus to endorse her candidacy for leader. The majority of the caucus supported the campaigns of Kevin Falcon and George Abbott, who were each endorsed by 19 MLAs. While many saw Clark as the best hope for the party there were fears that Clark's past background with the federal Liberal Party could fracture the party. The BC Liberals are not affiliated with any party at the federal level and is considered a "free-enterprise coalition" made up of both federal Conservatives and Liberals, and there were fears that right-wing supporters would move to the British Columbia Conservative Party which had started to make a comeback in the province after decades of dormancy.

Her campaign faced questions regarding her involvement in the sale of BC Rail due to her cabinet position and family connection to people "mentioned prominently in court documents, including search warrants", with opposition members stating that she "wants to shut down the public's questions about the scandal". It was in the wake of the controversial Basi-Virk guilty pleas that ended the trial proceedings that she declared her candidacy for the party leadership on her radio show. Clark had called for more questions to be answered about BC Rail, but since then has said that there is no need for a public inquiry, as have the other Liberal Party leadership contenders.

At the leadership convention held on February 26, 2011, Clark was elected leader of the BC Liberals on the third ballot, over former Health Minister Kevin Falcon. She won 52 per cent of the vote, compared to 48 per cent for Falcon.

Premier of British Columbia (2011–2017)

Clark was sworn in as premier of British Columbia on March 14, 2011, and unveiled a new smaller cabinet on the same day. At the time of her swearing in, she did not hold a seat in the legislature. Clark ran in former Premier Gordon Campbell's riding of Vancouver-Point Grey and defeated NDP candidate David Eby by 595 votes. Her win marked the first time that a governing party won a by-election in 30 years.

After Clark became premier, the Liberal Party saw a bounce in support and lead in opinion polls, after falling behind the Official Opposition NDP under Campbell. However, the increase in support was short lived and within months the party had fallen behind the NDP once again. Several polls eventually showed a statistical tie between the Liberals and the minor Conservative Party, with support for each party in the low twenties, while support for the NDP was in the high 40s. Internal problems within the Conservative Party towards the end of 2012 saw the party bleed support to the Liberals.

In the summer of 2012, several high-profile caucus members, including the Ministers of Education and Finance, announced they wouldn't seek re-election. Though Premier Clark suggested she "expected" the resignations, the news shook her government. The Quick Wins ethnic outreach scandal, where the Liberals used government resources as part of their partisan ethnic outreach activities, generated public outcry.

During her premiership, she was accused of conflict of interest by MLA and former BC Liberal cabinet minister John van Dongen in relation to the sale of BC Rail during her service as a cabinet minister in the Campbell government. In April 2013, B.C.’s Conflict of Interest Commissioner released a decision that Clark had been in neither a real nor apparent conflict of interest.

In June 2022 the Cullen Commission of Inquiry into Money Laundering in British Columbia final report stated: "In 2015... the premier learned that casinos conducted and managed by a Crown corporation and regulated by government were reporting transactions involving enormous quantities of cash as suspicious. Despite receiving this information, Ms. Clark failed to determine whether these funds were being accepted by the casinos (and in turn contributing to the revenue of the Province) and failed to ensure such funds were not accepted."

2013 re-election
As the 2013 general election approached, polls showed that Clark was one of the least popular premiers in Canada.  Two months prior to the election, The Province newspaper's front page featured a column by pundit Michael Smyth with the banner headline: "If This Man Kicked A Dog He Would Still Win The Election." However, Clark ran a "tightly-focused campaign that centred on jobs, LNG, and a 'debt free' B.C."  During the leaders' televised debate, Clark attacked NDP leader Adrian Dix for his "waffling position on the Kinder Morgan pipeline expansion". Dix's strategy of taking the "high road", similar to Jack Layton's successful approach in the 2011 federal election, left him vulnerable to "relentless [BC] Liberal attacks on the economic competence of his party".

Clark defied pollster predictions by leading her party to victory, its fourth consecutive mandate but her first, in the May 13, 2013 provincial election reversing a 20-point lead held by the BC NDP at the beginning of the campaign. However, she suffered personal defeat in Vancouver-Point Grey, losing her seat to NDP candidate David Eby by a margin of 785 votes. According to parliamentary precedent, she was entitled to remain premier, but had to win a by-election in order to sit in the Legislative Assembly. She did not rule out running in a riding outside the Lower Mainland in order to get back into the chamber, telling The Globe and Mail that she believed one reason she lost her own riding was that she was devoting so much time to serving the entire province.

On June 4, Clark announced she would run in a by-election for the safe Liberal seat of Westside-Kelowna to re-enter the Legislative Assembly.  The incumbent MLA, government whip Ben Stewart, resigned in Clark's favour. Clark won the by-election on July 10, 2013, taking more than 60 per cent of the vote over NDP candidate Carole Gordon.

Race relations
In May 2014, Clark gave a formal apology for 160 historical racist and discriminatory policies imposed against Chinese-Canadians:

While the governments which passed these laws and policies acted in a manner that [was] lawful at the time, today this racist discrimination is seen by British Columbians — represented by all members of the legislative assembly — as unacceptable and intolerable. The entire legislative assembly acknowledges the perseverance of Chinese Canadians that was demonstrated with grace and dignity throughout our history while being oppressed by unfair and discriminatory historical laws.

In October 2014, the British Columbia government exonerated First Nations leaders who had been sentenced to be hanged in the Chilcotin War by Judge Begbie in 1864.  Clark stated, "We confirm without reservation that these six Tsilhqot'in chiefs are fully exonerated for any crime or wrongdoing."

2017 campaign 

On September 14, 2016, the B.C. Liberal Party named executive director Laura Miller to be the party's campaign director for the May 9, 2017 provincial election. At the time, Miller was facing charges in Ontario for allegedly deleting emails while in service with the Dalton McGuinty provincial Liberal government, though she was later found not guilty.

The BC Liberals planned a bridge to replace the Massey Tunnel. The Liberal government instituted taxes for Metro Vancouver property purchases by foreign buyers ("Foreign Buyers Tax"), and implemented a program of no-interest loans from the government to first-time home buyers.

Clark campaigned on her government's economic track record, however the opposition NDP and Greens criticized her inaction on "lax political fundraising laws" and portrayed her as "beholden to big money interests", attacking the BC Liberals on "housing, transit and other affordability issues". While B.C. enjoyed strong economic growth and her government had five balanced budgets, B.C. was also "becoming behind the country’s most unequal province, socio-economically speaking, thanks to 37 per cent cuts to income tax levies, tightened rules for welfare eligibility, cuts to child-care subsidies, reductions in support for women’s centres and the doubling of post-secondary tuitions". Furthermore, Clark's approval ratings dropped due to her "ruthless, hyper-partisan style" which led to the perception that to her "winning always seemed so much more important than governing", in the wake of numerous scandals such as "ethnic outreach" and "triple delete" document destruction. Clark also faced "relentless criticism over bottomless corporate and foreign donations that gave her party a four-fold advantage over the NDP, such that even The New York Times labelled B.C. the "wild west" of political cash and the province's elections agency referred its investigation to the RCMP". During her leadership of the B.C. Liberals, she had shifted them "so far to the right [with regards to environmental and energy policies] to appease its ascendant federal Conservative flank it is now unrecognizable from the centrist party led by Gordon Campbell, her predecessor". The combination of these controversies caused Liberal support in Metro Vancouver to collapse, as an estimated 100,000 voters switched from the Liberals to the Greens.

Furthermore, a video of Clark having a run-in with a disgruntled voter inside a North Vancouver grocery store went viral with the hashtag #IamLinda.

In the 2017 general election, the BC Liberals held the largest number of seats (43), ahead of the NDP (41) and Greens (3), but they were one seat short of forming a majority in the Legislative Assembly.

Return to the opposition and retirement
After the election, the Liberals entered negotiations with the Green Party of British Columbia, which held the balance of power in the legislative assembly; however, on May 29, 2017, the Greens instead reached a confidence and supply agreement with the official opposition NDP, which on paper allowed the NDP to form a minority government by one seat. Although NDP leader John Horgan and Green Party leader Andrew Weaver did not have a close personal relationship, Weaver picked the NDP over the Liberals, citing Clark's dismantling of the province's climate change plan (that Weaver worked with then-Premier Gordon Campbell to develop prior to entering politics) plus support for energy companies and pipelines. Furthermore, Horgan reached out to Weaver personally while Clark did not.

Nonetheless, the Liberal government did not relinquish power yet, and Clark's new cabinet was sworn in on June 8. Clark subsequently recalled the legislative assembly to test its confidence in her government, with a speech from the throne that included billions of dollars in new funding and key policies supported by the NDP and Greens. Critics saw the throne speech as a cynical way for the Clark government to "desperately cling to power in selling out her party and its supporters in offering a de facto 'renewed' policy platform that stands in stark contrast to the last several years of the B.C. Liberal government and the still-warm corpse of the party’s election platform". Clark's gambit was regarded as unprincipled "because it’s disrespectful to voters who rely on parties as aggregators of ideas that lead to policies they like", noted that the 30 pledges were absent from the Liberals' election platform, but also the "dramatic conversion to an NDP/Green-light version of her party appear like an over-correction, given the modest shift in support" as the Liberals lost 4 percentage points of popular vote in the general election.  However, both the NDP and Green Party leaders said they would not consider legislation by the Liberal minority government, and none of their MLAs broke ranks to support the throne speech.

On June 29, Clark's minority government was defeated 44–42 after Horgan introduced a no-confidence motion as an amendment to the throne speech. Clark then asked Lieutenant Governor Judith Guichon for a new election, contending that an NDP minority government would be unstable due to the need for one of the NDP's members to become speaker. Clark argued that this would force the frequent use of the speaker's casting vote to break 43–43 ties. Guichon did not agree and refused to dissolve the legislature. Clark then resigned as premier, and Guichon invited Horgan to form a minority government, which took office on July 18.

On July 28, Clark announced that she would resign as Liberal Party Leader and exit from politics, effective August 4, 2017.

Post-politics 
Clark endorsed Jean Charest in the 2022 Conservative Party of Canada leadership election.

References

External links

Official Biography, Office of the Premier

1965 births
Living people
Alumni of the University of Edinburgh
Canadian Anglicans
Canadian female first ministers
Canadian people of Scottish descent
Canadian talk radio hosts
Deputy premiers of British Columbia
Education ministers of British Columbia
Leaders of the British Columbia Liberal Party
Members of the Executive Council of British Columbia
People from Burnaby
Premiers of British Columbia
Simon Fraser University alumni
Women MLAs in British Columbia
21st-century Canadian politicians
21st-century Canadian women politicians
Canadian women radio hosts